The 2002 Cheltenham Gold Cup was a horse race which took place at Cheltenham on Thursday 14 March 2002. It was the 74th running of the Cheltenham Gold Cup, and it was won by Best Mate. The winner was ridden by Jim Culloty and trained by Henrietta Knight. The pre-race favourite Looks Like Trouble finished thirteenth.

It was the first running of the Gold Cup for two years, as it had been cancelled in 2001 because of a foot-and-mouth crisis.

Race details
 Sponsor: Tote
 Winner's prize money: £174,000.00
 Going: Good
 Number of runners: 18
 Winner's time: 6m 50.1s

Full result

* The distances between the horses are shown in lengths or shorter. PU = pulled-up.† Trainers are based in Great Britain unless indicated.

Winner's details
Further details of the winner, Best Mate:

 Foaled: 28 January 1995 in Ireland
 Sire: Un Desperado; Dam: Katday (Miller's Mate)
 Owner: Jim Lewis
 Breeder: Jacques Van't Hart

References
 
 sportinglife.com
 telegraph.co.uk – "Best Mate surges to Gold Cup glory" – March 14, 2002.

Cheltenham Gold Cup
 2002
Cheltenham Gold Cup
Cheltenham Gold Cup
2000s in Gloucestershire